Ofelia Fernández (born 14 April 2000) is an Argentine politician and political activist. She is the youngest member of the Buenos Aires City Legislature, having been elected on 27 October 2019, at  only 19 years of age.

Early life and education
Ofelia Fernández was born on 14 April 2000, as the daughter of a musician father and a bureau de change employee mother. She attained her high school degree at the Escuela Superior de Comercio Carlos Pellegrini. At High school she became the school's youngest president of the student body and the first one to be re-elected. As a student body president she got often involved in student strikes.

Political career
An activist and feminist, Fernández participated in the demonstrations in support of the legalization of abortion in Argentina, and spoke at the commission-level debate during the treatment of the 2018 bill at the National Congress. Fernandez was also the youngest speaker at the G20 counter-summit organized by the Latin American Council of Social Sciences in November 2018.

Fernández was the third candidate in the Peronist Frente de Todos coalition's party list for the City Legislature 2019 election. She cast her first vote during the Primary elections in August. She was elected to the city legislature on 27 October 2019, commencing her legislative term on 10 December of the same year. Following her election to the legislature, Fernández was then highlighted by various sources as "the youngest legislator in Latin America."

Fernández is a member of Vamos, a left-wing group organized within the Patria Grande Front. Within the City Legislature, she sits in the Frente de Todos parliamentary bloc.

Electoral history

References

External links

Ofelia Fernández on Twitter
Buenos Aires City Legislature profile

2000 births
Living people
Politicians from Buenos Aires
Members of the Buenos Aires City Legislature
21st-century Argentine politicians
21st-century Argentine women politicians
Argentine feminists